This is a list of the Ministers of the Natural Environment and their preceding offices.

Secretary of Natural Environment (Ministry of the Interior)
 Paulo Nogueira Neto (1973-1985)
 Roberto Messias Franco (1985-1985)

Ministry of Urban Development and Natural Environment
 Flávio Rios Peixoto da Silveira (1985-1986)
 Deni Lineu Schwartz (1986-1987)
 Prisco Viana (1987-1988)

Secretary of Natural Environment for the President
 Ben-hur Luttembarck Batalha (1988-1989)
 José Lutzenberger (1990-1992)
 José Goldemberg (1992-1992)
 Flávio Miragaia Perri (1992-1992)

Minister of Natural Environment
 Fernando Coutinho Jorge (1992-1993)

Minister of Natural Environment and the Legal Amazon
 Rubens Ricupero (1993-1994)
 Henrique Brandão Cavalcanti (1994-1994)

Minister of Natural Environment, Water Resources and the Legal Amazon
 Gustavo Krause (1995-1998)

Minister of Natural Environment

References

Natural Environment
Ministers of Natural Environment
Government ministries of Brazil